Pershing Road may refer to:

 Pershing Road (Chicago)
 Pershing Road (Weehawken), New Jersey